Lucas Cano (born 9 May 1995) is an Argentine footballer who plays for Arsenal de Sarandí.

In 2017, Cano was loaned to Malaysian club Felda United for one-year deal. However he was released during mid season transfer.

References

External links
 
 Profile at Fox Sports
 Profile at Futbol Paratados (Spanish)
 Profile at ESPN (Spanish)

1996 births
Living people
Argentine footballers
Argentine expatriate footballers
Argentina international footballers
Association football defenders
Footballers from Buenos Aires
Argentinos Juniors footballers
Deportes La Serena footballers
Chacarita Juniors footballers
San Martín de Tucumán footballers
Arsenal de Sarandí footballers
Argentine Primera División players
Primera Nacional players
Malaysia Super League players
Primera B de Chile players
Argentine expatriate sportspeople in Chile
Argentine expatriate sportspeople in Malaysia
Expatriate footballers in Chile
Expatriate footballers in Malaysia